Makabana is a small town in the south of the Republic of Congo.

Transportation 

Makabana is served by a station on the national railway network and by Makabana Airport.

See also 

 Railway stations in Congo

References

External links 

Village Information

Populated places in the Republic of the Congo